Leucopogon hirsutus is a species of flowering plant in the heath family Ericaceae and is endemic to southern continental Australia. It is a low-lying or straggling shrub with elliptic to oblong leaves and inconspicuous, white, bell-shaped flowers.

Description

Taxonomy and naming
Leucopogon hirsutus was first formally described in 1845 by Otto Wilhelm Sonder in Johann Georg Christian Lehmann's Plantae Preissianae. The specific epithet (hirsutus) means "hirsute", referring to the stems and leaves.

Distribution and habitat
This leucopogon occurs in swampy places and on the edge of creeks in the Avon Wheatbelt, Jarrah Forest, Swan Coastal Plain, and Warren bioregions of south-western Western Australia and the southern Mount Lofty Ranges and Kangaroo Island of South Australia.

Conservation status
Leucopogon hirsutus is listed as "not threatened" by the Government of Western Australia Department of Biodiversity, Conservation and Attractions.

References

hirsutus
Ericales of Australia
Flora of Western Australia
Flora of South Australia
Plants described in 1845
Taxa named by Otto Wilhelm Sonder